The stem is the most forward part of a boat or ship's bow and is an extension of the keel itself. It is often found on wooden boats or ships, but not exclusively.

Description
The stem is the curved edge stretching from the keel below, up to the gunwale of the boat. It is part of the physical structure of a wooden boat or ship that gives it strength at the critical section of the structure, bringing together the port and starboard side planks of the hull.

Plumb and raked stem

There are two styles of stems: plumb and raked. When the stem comes up from the water, if it is perpendicular to the waterline it is "plumb". If it is inclined at an angle to the waterline it is "raked". (For example, "The hull is single decked and characterized by a plumb stem, full bows, straight keel, moderate deadrise, and an easy turn of bilge.")

Stemhead

Because the stem is very sturdy, the top end of it may have something attached, either ornamental or functional in nature. On smaller vessels, this might be a simple wood carving (ornamental) or cleat (functional). On large wooden ships, figureheads can be attached to the upper end of the stem.

See also
 Beakhead
 Bow
 Deadwood
 Prow
 V-hull (boat)

References

Further reading
Steward, Robert. Boatbuilding Manual, 3rd edn. Camden, Maine: International Marine Publishing Company, 1987. 

Shipbuilding
Nautical terminology